Henning Elbirk   (November 8, 1908 – May 6, 1985) was a Danish composer and conductor.
He founded the Radio Denmark's Boys Choir in 1929 and went on to lead the choir for the next 50 years until 1979.
The choir toured across the world, holding concerts in the Soviet Union, Bulgaria, Canada and Israel. 
From 1968 to 1979 the choir also toured across the United States. In 1972, the choir sang the American National Anthem in Candlestick Park in front of 62'000 spectators and 35 million TV-viewers.

In 1979, he was awarded the Order of the Dannebrog.

Sources 
Hennig Elbrig on findagrave.com

See also
List of Danish composers

Male composers
1908 births
1985 deaths
20th-century Danish composers
20th-century Danish male musicians